Theisoa may refer to:

Theisoa (nymph), one of the nymphs in Greek mythology
Theisoa (moth), a genus of the moth family Gelechiidae
Theisoa, Greece, a village in the municipal unit of Andritsaina, Elis, Greece
Theisoa (Arcadia), a town of ancient Arcadia, Greece
Theisoa (Orchomenus), a town of ancient Arcadia, Greece